National Highway 234 is a national highway of India It was earlier known as National Highway 121 before renumbering of all national highways by National Highway Authority of India in 2010.

Route
 NH34 near Kannauj
 Bidhuna
 Etawah
 Kishni
 NH 34 near Bhongaon

References

External links
NH 234 on OpenStreetMap

National highways in India
National Highways in Uttar Pradesh